"The Long Goodbye" is the thirteenth episode of the fourth season of American serial political drama The West Wing. The episode aired on January 15, 2003 on NBC. In this episode, Claudia Jean "C. J." Cregg returns to her home of Dayton, Ohio, struggling with her father's Alzheimer's disease. "The Long Goodbye" is the only episode to not have been written by Aaron Sorkin in his tenure on the show, and it features Matthew Modine in his first appearance on an episodic television series. Reception for the episode was mixed.

Plot
The episode centers mostly around White House Press Secretary C. J. Cregg, who is portrayed by Allison Janney. C. J. is scheduled to give a speech at her high school's twentieth year reunion party, titled "The Promise of a Generation". Toby Ziegler urges a reluctant C. J. to go, booking her on a flight. At the airport in Dayton, C. J. reconnects with an old classmate named Marco Arlens, with whom she agrees to go to the reunion. However, she remains largely focused on doing her job at the White House from afar until she arrives at the house of her father, Talmidge Cregg. The house is cluttered and chaotic, and Talmidge Cregg is significantly affected by his case of Alzheimer's disease, shifting frequently between lucidity and forgetfulness. C. J. learns that her father's new wife, Molly, has left him, and goes to confront her the next morning. Molly, while apologetic and ashamed, calls her marriage to Talmidge Cregg a "mistake" and says that she does not want to be his caretaker. When C. J. and her father go fishing, he momentarily cannot recognize her in a rant, and when C. J. tells him that he needs care, he refuses. C. J. even offers to quit her job to take care of him, to which he replies that he would rather she keep her job than watch the "demolition derby going on in my brain". They visit Talmidge's friend, a neurologist, who recommends a nursing home and tells them they need to start making plans today, because the condition will only get worse. Marco Arlens comes to Talmidge's house to pick up C. J., and while Arlens is fixing a pocket watch Talmidge has been carrying around, Talmidge says that he cannot recognize a framed picture on his wall, which has C. J. in it. They go to the reunion, and in the middle of C. J.'s speech, she receives a call from Toby Ziegler, telling her that there was an attack on a U.S. embassy. She leaves, and while she initially wants to return next week, Talmidge tells her that she could not reasonably fly to Ohio and back to Washington regularly, leaving the two to hug each other goodbye and walk to the car.

Reception
Reviews of the episode were mixed. Writing for The A.V. Club, Steve Heisler comments that the episode moves at a much slower pace than other episodes, or "at the pace of normal television", due to the episode consisting of a singular plotline instead of competing stories interwoven with each other. Heisler draws some comparisons between Talmidge Cregg and President Josiah Bartlet, commenting that both have father-figure roles to characters on the show in their own ways and that both "ask those around them to forgive a whole lot in exchange for brilliance and charm". Heisler praises the show's ability to stay true to itself without key characters such as Bartlet and Leo McGarry. By contrast, Wired magazine, in recommending that readers binge The West Wing, nonetheless regarded "The Long Goodbye" as an episode to skip. The magazine commented that it felt similar to episodes written after Sorkin left, and experienced a similar drop in quality.

Writing for The Wesleyan Argus, Hannah Reale examined Talmidge Cregg and his case of Alzheimer's. Reale criticized the episode's portrayal of the disease, calling the portrayal "insubstantial" and commenting that Cregg switches between early- and late-stage symptoms of Alzheimer's within moments to advance the plot. However, she also stated that there can be moments where inappropriate or symptomatic comments are let slip as Cregg does in the episode. Reale approved of the way Cregg's relationship with his most recent ex-wife was portrayed, commenting that the disease does have an effect on loved ones and causes strain. Reale ultimately argues that bad portrayal of Alzheimer's as merely a plot device can diminish public perception of the effects the disease can have on those afflicted, as well as their friends and family.

References

External links
 

The West Wing (season 4) episodes
2003 television episodes